Dungarwas (or Dungerwas) is a village situated in Rewari district, India.

Temple of Baba Rupadas Ji is the famous religious place in Dungarwas village.

Demographics
As of 2011 India census, Dungarwas had a population of 1666 in 299 households. Male constitutes 51.86% of the population and females 48.13%. Dungarwas has an average literacy rate of 75.99%, more than the national average of 74%; male literacy is 57.66%, and female literacy is 42.33% of total literates. In Dungarwas, 11.7% of the population is under 6 years of age.

Adjacent villages
Nikhri
Masani
Rasgan
Jonawas
Khijuri

References 

Villages in Rewari district